A general election was held in the U.S. state of Iowa on November 8, 2022. All of Iowa's executive officers were up for election, as well as a United States Senate seat, all four of Iowa's seats in the United States House of Representatives, 25 (half) of the seats in the Iowa Senate, and all 100 seats in the Iowa House of Representatives. Primary elections were held on June 7, 2022.

Governor and lieutenant governor

Incumbent Republican Governor Kim Reynolds ran for re-election to a second full term as governor. Reynolds won the Republican primary unopposed. 

Deidre DeJear, a small business owner and nominee for Secretary of State of Iowa in 2018, won the Democratic primary unopposed.

In Iowa, nominees for lieutenant governor are chosen at party conventions. They then run on a ticket with the gubernatorial nominee. Incumbent Republican Lieutenant Governor Adam Gregg is running for re-election to a second term in office.

Attorney General

Incumbent Democratic Attorney General Tom Miller, who had served in the position since 1995, and previously from 1979 to 1991, ran for re-election to a eighth consecutive and eleventh overall term in office.

Guthrie County attorney Brenna Bird won the Republican primary unopposed. 

Bird defeated incumbent Attorney General Tom Miller with 50.9% of votes.

Secretary of State

Incumbent Republican Secretary of State Paul Pate, Democratic Linn County auditor Joel Miller, and Clinton County auditor Eric Van Lancker ran. Miller defeated Van Lancker in the primary election on June 7th. 

Pate defeated Miller in the general election with 60.06% of votes.

Treasurer 
Incumbent Democratic State Treasurer Michael Fitzgerald, who had served in the position since 1983, ran for re-election to an eleventh term in office.

The Republican nominee was Roby Smith, a State Senator.

Smith defeated Fitzgerald in the general election with 51.27% of the votes.

Auditor
Incumbent Democratic State Auditor Rob Sand ran for re-election to a second term in office.

Republican businessman Todd Halbur defeated former State Representative Mary Ann Hanusa in the primary election.

Halbur conceded defeat on November 18th.

Secretary of Agriculture
Incumbent Republican Secretary of Agriculture Mike Naig ran for re-election to a second term in office.

Polk County Soil and Water Conservation District Commissioner John Norwood ran for the Democrats.

Naig defeated Norwood in the general election with 61.14% of the votes.

United States Senate

Incumbent Republican Senator Chuck Grassley ran for reelection to an eighth term in office. 

Five Democrats filed to run: retired U.S. Navy admiral Michael Franken, former U.S. Representative Abby Finkenauer, Minden city councilor Glenn Hurst, former Crawford County supervisor Dave Muhlbauer (withdrawn), and former state representative Bob Krause (withdrawn).

Grassley defeated Franken in the general election with 56.03% of votes.

United States House of Representatives

All of Iowa's four seats in the United States House of Representatives were up for election in 2022 and were contested. Republicans won all four seats, defeating Democratic incumbent Cindy Axne in Iowa's 3rd congressional district.

Iowa General Assembly

Ballot Measures

Amendment 1 
The Right to Keep and Bear Arms Initiative would enshrine in the state constitution a fundamental right to keep and bear arms.

References

 
Iowa